Hans-Dieter Riechel (18 December 1934 – 2 December 2014) was a German biathlete. He competed in the 20 km individual event at the 1964 Winter Olympics.

References

External links
 

1934 births
2014 deaths
German male biathletes
Olympic biathletes of the United Team of Germany
Biathletes at the 1964 Winter Olympics
People from Oberharz am Brocken
Sportspeople from Saxony-Anhalt